Mishihuajanan (possibly from Ancash Quechua mishi cat, Quechua waqay crying, to cry, -na a suffix, "where the cat cries", -n a suffix) is a mountain in the Andes of Peru, about  high. It is located in the Lima Region, Cajatambo Province, Cajatambo District, and in the Oyón Province, Oyón District. Mishihuajanan lies southwest of Millpo and north of Huayllajirca.

References

Mountains of Peru
Mountains of Lima Region